Jean Daudé (born 20 October 1973 in Nîmes), is a former rugby union footballer who played with France and CSBJ, who plays as Lock. His rugby career ended abruptly March 26, 2000 A head impact against head with a player of Castres Olympique (Jeremy Davidson Lock and current member of staff CO) earned him a broken sixth cervical vertebra with a serious contusion of the spinal cord.

External links
Jean Daudé

1973 births
French rugby union players
Living people
France international rugby union players
Sportspeople from Nîmes
Rugby union locks